The 2017 UNCAF U-16 Tournament was the 7th UNCAF U-16 Tournament, a biennial international football tournament contested by men's under-16 national teams.  Organized by UNCAF, the tournament took place in El Salvador between 20 and 25 November 2017.

The matches were played at Complejo Deportivo FESFUT.  Five Central American teams took part of the tournament, playing each other in a round-robin format.  Guatemala did not participate due to their sanction by FIFA and Belize did not send a team.

Venue

Final standings

Results

References

External links
UNCAF Official Website

2017
2017 in youth association football
2017–18 in Salvadoran football
2017